The 2015 League 1 Cup or 2015 iPro Cup  for sponsorship reasons is the first year in the tournaments existence. 16 teams are playing in this years tournament, no team in a division higher than the Championship One. The tournament is seen as a replacement for the recently ceased Northern Rail Cup however teams from the Championship are not eligible to compete.

Teams competing 
 Barrow Raiders - 1st appearance 
 Coventry Bears - 1st appearance
 East Leeds - 1st appearance
 Hemel Stags - 1st appearance
 Keighley Cougars  - 1st appearance
 London Skolars - 1st appearance
 Newcastle Thunder - 1st appearance
 North Wales Crusaders - 1st appearance
 Oldham R.L.F.C. - 1st appearance
 Rochdale Hornets - 1st appearance
 South Wales Scorpions - 1st appearance
 Swinton Lions - 1st appearance
 University of Gloucestershire All Golds - 1st appearance
 West Hull - 1st appearance
 York City Knights - 1st appearance

First round

Second round

Semi finals

Final

References

RFL League 1
2015 in English rugby league
2015 in Welsh rugby league